Daniel Whitehead (born 23 October 1993) is an English professional footballer who plays as a midfielder for  club AFC Fylde.

He began his career at Stockport County, making his first-team debut during the 2011–12 season. He was sold to West Ham United in June 2013 and featured in one FA Cup game before his contract was terminated in January 2015. He had a brief spell at Accrington Stanley two months later, before joining Macclesfield Town in July 2015. He was sold on to Wigan Athletic in January 2016, though returned to Macclesfield on loan for the rest of the 2015–16 season. He spent the first half of the 2016–17 season on loan at Cheltenham Town and ended the season back on loan at Macclesfield Town, for whom he was an unused substitute in the 2017 FA Trophy final.

His contract at Wigan was terminated in September 2017 and he went on to rejoin Macclesfield Town on a permanent basis. He was a key player as the club won promotion back to the English Football League after finishing top of the National League table in the 2017–18 season. He signed with Salford City in May 2018 and helped the club to win promotion out of the National League via the play-offs in 2019. He returned to Macclesfield Town for a third loan spell at the club in January 2020 and joined Port Vale on a free transfer in August 2020. Transfer-listed at Port Vale at the end of the 2020–21 season, he was loaned out to Altrincham in October 2021. He joined AFC Fylde in January 2022.

Career

Stockport County
Whitehead joined Stockport County at the age of 15. At the age of 17 he sat on the bench in five games at the end of the 2010–11 season as the club were relegated out of the Football League. He made his senior debut for the "Hatters" on 27 September 2011, coming on as a 75h-minute substitute for Michael Paton in a 4–2 defeat to Fleetwood Town at Edgeley Park. He scored his first career goal on 6 October, in a 2–2 draw at Cambridge United. He ended the 2011–12 season with 18 appearances to his name, as Stockport posted a 16th-place finish in the Conference Premier, and he signed a new contract in the summer. He was a key player for manager Jim Gannon in the 2012–13 campaign, scoring six goals in 45 appearances as County dropped into the Conference North with a second relegation in three years. He then handed in a transfer request to new manager Ian Bogie.

West Ham United
He was recommended to Premier League club West Ham United by former Stockport boss Dietmar Hamann and was signed for an undisclosed fee on 20 June 2013 after impressing "Hammers" manager Sam Allardyce whilst on trial; he signed a two-year contract with the option of a third year. He made his first-team debut on 5 January 2014 at Nottingham Forest in the FA Cup; West Ham lost the game 5–0. This was his only appearance for West Ham and he left the Boleyn Ground when his contract was terminated on 28 January 2015 as part of a "massive cull of the development squad" by Terry Westley.

Accrington Stanley
On 17 March 2015, Whitehead signed a short-term contract with League Two side Accrington Stanley. He made his debut for Stanley later that day, coming on for Sean Maguire 75 minutes into a 2–2 draw at Wycombe Wanderers. He made his first start in the Football League on 25 April, in a 4–0 defeat at Dagenham & Redbridge. These were his only two appearances during his time at the Crown Ground and he was not retained by manager John Coleman at the end of the 2014–15 season.

Macclesfield Town
On 31 July 2015, Whitehead signed a one-year deal with National League club Macclesfield Town after a successful trial period. He scored his first goal for the club on 29 August, the opening goal of a 2–1 defeat to Chester, latching on to a cross from Danny Rowe to smash a shot from the edge of the area into the bottom right corner of the net. Paul Turnbull picked up an injury early the next month, which gave Whitehead establish himself in the first team with a run of 18 successive starts.

Wigan Athletic
On 8 January 2016, Whitehead signed a two-and-a-half-year-deal with League One side Wigan Athletic for an undisclosed fee; "Latics" boss Gary Caldwell cited the player's potential, saying "every club is on the lookout for fresh talent". He was immediately loaned back to Macclesfield for the remainder of the 2015–16 season and scored seven goals from 41 appearances as Macclesfield posted a tenth place finish in the National League.

On 22 July 2016, he joined League Two club Cheltenham Town on a season-long loan after manager Gary Johnson saw him as a player who "will fit our game perfectly". He started the "Robins" opening game of the 2016–17 season, a 1–1 draw with Leyton Orient at Whaddon Road. However he was dropped to the bench at the end of the month and his loan spell was terminated on 1 January after he went nearly two months without playing a game.

Return to Macclesfield
On 20 January 2017, he rejoined former side Macclesfield Town on loan until the end of the 2016–17 season. He played ten games for Macclesfield, scoring two goals, including the only goal of the third round FA Trophy game with Forest Green Rovers. Macclesfield went on to reach the 2017 FA Trophy final, though Whitehead was an unused substitute at Wembley Stadium as his teammates were beaten 3–2 by York City.

On 14 September 2017, his contract at Wigan was mutually terminated and he rejoined Macclesfield Town on a contract until the end of the 2017–18 season. He scored seven goals in 38 games, helping Macclesfield to win promotion back into the Football League as champions of the National League. He was offered a new contract in the summer.

Salford City
On 17 May 2018, he joined Salford City; "Ammies" manager Graham Alexander that "Whitehead had a fantastic season last year at this level, scored some important goals but his overall play, he was one of the best players at this level so we were delighted to get him on board". He made his debut in the opening match of the 2018–19 season on 4 August as Salford drew 1–1 with Leyton Orient at Moor Lane. He scored four goals from 44 appearances throughout the campaign and played in the National League play-off final as Salford secured a place in the EFL with a 3–0 victory over AFC Fylde at Wembley.

He scored his first goal in League Two on 24 August 2019, converting a penalty as Salford drew 2–2 at Carlisle United. On 21 January 2020, he rejoined Macclesfield Town for a fourth spell, on loan until the end of the 2019–20 season. He featured ten times, helping Mark Kennedy's "Silkmen" to avoid relegation despite having had 13 points deducted.

Port Vale
On 3 August 2020, Whitehead cancelled the last year of his contract with Salford and signed a two-year deal with League Two rivals Port Vale. The move reunited him with former Macclesfield boss John Askey, who brought Whitehead in to compete with Luke Joyce, Manny Oyeleke, Scott Burgess and Tom Conlon for one of three places in central midfield. He failed to make much on an impact early in the 2020–21 season having struggled with injuries and poor form and was transfer-listed by new manager Darrell Clarke at the end of the campaign. He was not given a squad number for the 2021–22 season and Clarke said that he would try and arrange a loan move into the National League.

On 15 October 2021, he joined National League club Altrincham on a one-month loan deal. He featured ten times for the "Robins" before he was recalled to his parent club on Christmas Eve after Vale suffered an injury and illness crisis. On 7 January 2022, he left Port Vale after his contract was cancelled by mutual consent.

AFC Fylde
On 11 January 2022, Whitehead joined National League club AFC Fylde on a contract until the end of the 2021–22 season, with the club retaining the option of a further 12 months. He scored one goal in eleven appearances for James Rowe's "Coasters", including the play-off semi-final defeat to Boston United at Mill Farm.

Style of play
Whitehead is an energetic, versatile and hard working midfielder.

Career statistics

Honours
Macclesfield Town
FA Trophy runner-up: 2017
National League: 2017–18

Salford City
National League play-offs: 2019

References

1993 births
Living people
People from Stretford
Footballers from Greater Manchester
English footballers
Association football midfielders
Stockport County F.C. players
West Ham United F.C. players
Accrington Stanley F.C. players
Macclesfield Town F.C. players
Wigan Athletic F.C. players
Cheltenham Town F.C. players
Salford City F.C. players
Port Vale F.C. players
Altrincham F.C. players
AFC Fylde players
National League (English football) players
English Football League players